The 1979 Southeast Asian Games, officially known as the 10th Southeast Asian Games, was a subcontinental multi-sport event held in Jakarta, Indonesia from 21 to 30 September 1979. This was the first time that Indonesia hosted the games. Indonesia is the fifth nation to host the Southeast Asian Games after Thailand, Burma, Malaysia and Singapore. The games was officially opened and closed by President Soeharto at the Senayan Sports Stadium. The final medal tally was led by host Indonesia, followed by Thailand and Burma.

The games

Participating nations
Brunei was a British colony at that time.

Sports

Medal table

Key

References

 Percy Seneviratne (1993) Golden Moments: the S.E.A Games 1959-1991 Dominie Press, Singapore 
 History of the SEA Games

 
Southeast Asian Games
1979 in multi-sport events
International sports competitions hosted by Indonesia
Southeast Asian Games, 1979
1979 in Asian sport
Multi-sport events in Indonesia
Sports competitions in Jakarta
20th century in Jakarta
1979 in Southeast Asia